This list of botanical gardens and arboretums in Arkansas is intended to include all significant botanical gardens and arboretums in the U.S. state of Arkansas

See also
List of botanical gardens and arboretums in the United States

References 

 
Arboreta in Arkansas
botanical gardens and arboretums in Arkansas